Basy (Ukrainian: Баси) is a railway station in Novi Basy, Sumy, Sumy Oblast, Ukraine. The station is at a junction with the Basy-Pushkarne line and serves as a passenger and minor freight station. It is on the Sumy Directorate of Southern Railways on the Bilopillya-Basy, Basy-Boromlya, and Basy-Pushkarne lines.

Notes

 Tariff Guide No. 4. Book 1 (as of 05/15/2021) (Russian) Archived 05/15/2021.

References

External links

Basy on railwayz.info
Passenger train schedule
Suburban train schedule

Railway stations in Sumy Oblast
Sumy
Buildings and structures in Sumy Oblast